Marungi is a locality in northern Victoria. The locality is shared between the local government areas of the Shire of Moira and City of Greater Shepparton.

The post office opened on 20 October 1879 and was closed on 17 May 1971.

References

External links

Towns in Victoria (Australia)
City of Greater Shepparton
Shire of Moira